Saint-Thégonnec Loc-Eguiner is a commune in the Finistère department of western France. The municipality was established on 1 January 2016 and consists of the former communes of Saint-Thégonnec and Loc-Eguiner-Saint-Thégonnec.

Population

See also 
Communes of the Finistère department

References 

Saintthegonnecloceguiner

Communes nouvelles of Finistère
Populated places established in 2016
2016 establishments in France